The Japan Championship Rice Bowl is an annual American football national championship game held in Japan every January 3 that determines the champion of the X-League. Prior to the 2022 edition, the game matched up the champions of the Japan X Bowl with the college Koshien Bowl winners. The game can draw over 30,000 spectators.

All Star Era

National Championship Era

X-League vs College Era Results

X-League Championship Era

Records of teams

References

External links
  (Japanese)

American football bowls
American football competitions
American football in Japan
Sports competitions in Japan
College football bowls
1984 establishments in Japan
Recurring sporting events established in 1984